The 1949 Rice Owls football team was an American football team that represented Rice University during the 1949 college football season. The Owls were led by 10th-year head coach Jess Neely and played their home games at Rice Field in Houston, Texas. The team competed as a member of the Southwest Conference, winning the conference with an unbeaten record of 6–0. They ended the regular season with an overall record of 9–1, and were ranked fifth in the final AP Poll. Rice was invited to the 1950 Cotton Bowl Classic, where they defeated Southern Conference champion North Carolina.

Schedule

References

Rice
Rice Owls football seasons
Southwest Conference football champion seasons
Cotton Bowl Classic champion seasons
Rice Owls football